Local government is the third level of government in Australia, administered with limited autonomy under the states and territories, and in turn beneath the federal government. Local government is not mentioned in the Constitution of Australia, and two referendums in 1974 and 1988 to alter the Constitution relating to local government were unsuccessful. Every state/territory government recognises local government in its own respective constitution. Unlike the two-tier local government system in Canada or the United States, there is only one tier of local government in each Australian state/territory, with no distinction between counties and cities.

The Australian local government is generally run by a council, and its territory of public administration is referred to generically by the Australian Bureau of Statistics as the local government area or LGA, each of which encompasses multiple suburbs or localities often of different postcodes; however, stylised terms such as "city", "borough" and "shire" also have a geographic or historical interpretation. The council board members are generally known as councillors, and the head councillor is called the mayor.  As of August 2016, there were 547 local councils in Australia.

Despite the single tier of local governance in Australia, there are a number of extensive regions with relatively low populations that are not a part of any established LGA. Powers of local governments in these unincorporated areas may be exercised by special-purpose governing bodies established outside of the local legislation, as with Victoria's alpine resorts; or directly administered by state/territory governments, such as the entirety of the Australian Capital Territory.

Types of local government

Local governments are subdivisions of the six federated states as well as the Northern Territory. The Australian Capital Territory has no separate local government, and municipal functions in Canberra and the surrounding regions (normally performed by local governments in other states) are performed by the ACT territorial government. The Australian Bureau of Statistics (ABS), however, considers the entire ACT as an "unincorporated" local government area, even though it is technically a state-level administrative region.

Although all essentially identical in functions and jurisdictions, Australian local governments have a variety of different titles. The term "local government area" (LGA) is used by the ABS to collectively refer to all local government administrative zones regardless of the varying designations, whilst the local governing legislature itself is generally known as a council. In general, an urban/suburban LGA is called a "city", as in the City of Melbourne, City of Canada Bay and City of Bunbury; while an exurban/rural LGA covering a larger agricultural/natural area is usually called a "shire", as in Shire of Mornington Peninsula, Shire of Banana and Lachlan Shire.

Sometimes designations other than "city" or "shire" are used in the names of LGAs, and today the stylised titles of "town", "borough", "municipality", "district", "region", "community government", "Aboriginal council/shire" and "island" are used in addition. The word "municipality" occurs in some states with differing meanings: in New South Wales it is typically used for older urban areas, and the word is used for some rural towns in South Australia. Larger towns and small metropolitan exurban centres in Queensland and Western Australia simply use the term "town", while in Victoria they are designated as "rural city". Historically, the word "borough" was common for small towns and suburban centers in Victoria, but nowadays only the Borough of Queenscliffe remains as the one and only borough in the entire country. New South Wales and Queensland have also introduced a new term "region" for outback LGAs formed by the amalgamation of smaller shires and rural cities. In New South Wales, where the Local Government Act does not mandate adopting a designation, some local government areas are legally known simply as "council", such as Port Macquarie-Hastings Council, Inner West Council and Federation Council. Some rural areas in South Australia are known as "district council", and all the LGAs in Tasmania that were previously municipalities have been renamed "council".

Almost all local councils have the same administrative functions and similar political structures, regardless of their naming, and retain a particular designation ("shire", "borough", "town", "city") for historical reasons only. They will typically have an elected council and usually a mayor or shire president responsible for chairing meetings of the council. In some councils, the mayor is a directly elected figure, but in most cases the mayor is elected by the board of fellow councillors. The powers of mayors vary as well; for example, mayors in Queensland have broad executive functions, whereas mayors in New South Wales are essentially ceremonial figureheads who can only exercise power at the discretion of the council.

Most of the capital city LGAs administer only the central business districts and nearby central suburbs. A notable exception is the City of Brisbane, the most populous LGA in the country, which administers a significant part of the Brisbane metropolitan area. In most cases, when a city's population statistics are used, it is the statistical division population rather than the local government area.

Local governments by type and state 
The following table provides a summary of local government areas by states and territories by local government area types as of January 2017:

Classification
The Australian Classification of Local Governments (ACLG) categorises local governing authorities using the population, the population density and the proportion of the population that is classified as being urban for the council. The classification, at the two-digit level, is:

 RA Rural Agricultural
 RS Rural Significant
 RT Rural Remote
 UC Urban Capital
 UD Urban Developed
 UF Urban Fringe
 UR Urban Regional

Powers and functions

All local governments are approximately equal in their theoretical powers, although LGAs that encompass large cities such as Brisbane and the Gold Coast command more resources due to their larger population base. Unlike local governments in many other countries, services such as police, fire protection and schools are provided by state or territory government rather than by local councils.

The councils' chief responsibility in the first half of the 20th century was the provision of physical infrastructure such as roads, bridges and sewerage. From the 1970s the emphasis changed to community facilities such as libraries and parks, maintenance of local roads, town planning and development approvals, and local services such as waste disposal.  Child care, tourism and urban renewal were also beginning to be part of local governments' role.  These are financed by collection of local land taxes known as "rates," and grants from the state and Commonwealth governments. They are caricatured as being concerned only with the "three Rs": Rates, Roads and Rubbish.

However, the roles of local government areas in Australia have recently expanded as higher levels of government have devolved activities to the third tier.  Examples include the provision of community health services, regional airports and pollution control as well as community safety and accessible transport. The changes in services has been described as a shift from 'services to property' towards 'services to people'. Community expectations of local government in Australia has risen in the 21st century partly as a result of wider participation in decision making and transparent management practices.

Recent years have seen some State governments devolving additional powers onto LGAs. In Queensland and Western Australia LGAs have been granted the power to independently enact their own local subsidiary legislation, in contrast to the previous system of by-laws. Councils also have organised their own representative structures such as Local Government Associations and Regional Organisations of Councils.

Doctrines of new public management have shaped state government legislation towards increased freedoms aiming to allow greater flexibility on the part of local governments.

History
There is no mention of local government in the Constitution of Australia, though it is mentioned several times in the Annotated Constitution of Australia. "Municipal institutions and local government" appears in Annotation 447, and "Power of the Parliament of a Colony" appears under "Residuary Legislative Powers" on pages 935 and 936.

The first official local government in Australia was the Perth Town Trust, established in 1838, only three years after British settlement. The Adelaide Corporation followed, created by the province of South Australia in October 1840. The City of Melbourne and the Sydney Corporation followed, both in 1842. All of these early forms failed; it was not until the 1860s and 1870s that the various colonies established widespread stable forms of local government, mainly for the purpose of raising money to build roads in rural and outer-urban regions. Council representatives attended conventions before Federation, however local government was unquestionably regarded as outside the Constitutional realm.

In the 1970s, the Whitlam Government expanded the level of funding to local governments in Australia beyond grants for road construction. General purpose grants become available for the first time.

Reforms
Significant reforms took place in the 1980s and 1990s in which state governments used metrics and efficiency analysis developed within the private sector in the local government arena. Each state conducted an inquiry into the benefits of council amalgamations during the 1990s. In the early 1990s, Victoria saw the number of local councils reduced from 210 to 78. South Australia, Tasmania and Queensland saw some reductions in the number of local governments while Western Australia and New South Wales rejected compulsory mergers.  New South Wales eventually forced the merging of some councils. The main purpose of amalgamating councils was for greater efficiency and to improve operations, but forced amalgamation of councils is sometimes seen as a dilution of representative democracy.

An increase in the range of services offered by councils, but only minor cost savings of less than 10% have been noted by academics as outcomes after mergers. The council mergers have resulted in widespread job losses and lingering resentment from some whose roles have experienced a larger workload.

The growth of the Regional Organisations of Councils has also been a factor in local government reform in Australia. In 1995, there were 50 such agreements across the country.  A 2002 study identified 55 ROCs with the largest involving 18 councils.

Constitutional position
Local government powers are determined by state governments, and states have primary responsibility for funding and exclusive responsibility for supervision of local councils.

Local government is mentioned in the annotated Australian constitution, as a department of the State Governments, and they are mentioned in the constitutions of each of the six states.

Under the Constitution, the federal government cannot provide funding directly to local governments; a 1974 referendum sought to amend the Constitution to authorise the federal government to directly fund local governments, but it was defeated.

A 1988 referendum sought to explicitly insert mention of local government in the federal constitution but this was comprehensively defeated. A further referendum was proposed in 2013, but was cancelled due to the change in the election date.

Federal government interaction with local councils happens regularly through the provision of federal grants to help fund local government managed projects.

State/territory control

Local government in Australia has very limited legislative powers and no judicial powers, and executive-wise is subject to the exclusive jurisdiction of the state/territory it belongs to. The functions and practices of local councils are mostly centered around managing public services and land uses at the community level, and are similar throughout Australia, but can vary to some degree between jurisdictions. State departments oversee the activities of local councils and may intervene in their affairs when needed, subject to relevant legislation.

For more details in each state and territory, see the following :
 Local government areas of New South Wales
 Local government areas of the Northern Territory
 Local government in Queensland  and Local government areas of Queensland (list)
 Local government areas of South Australia
 Local government areas of Tasmania
 Local government in Victoria and Local government areas of Victoria (list)
 Local government areas of Western Australia

The Australian Capital Territory is not divided into local government areas, although it is regarded as a single "unincorporated" local government area during censusing.

Unincorporated areas
Unlike many other countries, Australia has only one level of local government immediately beneath state and territorial governments. Aside from very sparsely populated areas and a few other special cases, almost all of Australia is part of a local government area. Unincorporated areas are often in remote locations, cover vast areas or have very small populations.

Australian Capital Territory
The Australian Capital Territory has no municipalities and is in some sense an unincorporated area. The ACT government is directly responsible for matters normally carried out by a local government.

Many Canberra districts have community organisations called "community councils", but these are not part of the government (though they generally receive government funding). They do not have the power to change laws or policies, and their role is limited to advising government. They are effectively residents' associations.

New South Wales
New South Wales has 2 unincorporated areas:
 Unincorporated Far West Region, covering the western one third of the state (other than the City of Broken Hill). This area is sparsely populated. Local Government functions in this area are managed directly by the state government and its agencies.
 Lord Howe Island.

Northern Territory
In the Northern Territory, 1.45% of the total area and 4.0% of the population are in unincorporated areas, including Unincorporated Top End Region (Finniss-Mary, the largest), areas covered by the Darwin Rates Act—Nhulunbuy, Alyangula on Groote Eylandt in the northern region, and Yulara in the southern region.

South Australia
In South Australia, 60% of the state's  area is unincorporated and communities located within receive municipal services provided by a state agency, the Outback Communities Authority.

Victoria
Victoria has 10 unincorporated areas, which are either ski resorts or small islands:

 Falls Creek Alpine Resort
 French Island and Sandstone Island
 Elizabeth Island 
 Gabo Island
 Lady Julia Percy Island
 Lake Mountain Alpine Resort
 Mount Baw Baw Alpine Resort
 Mount Buller Alpine Resort
 Mount Hotham Alpine Resort
 Mount Stirling Alpine Resort

Western Australia
Western Australia has 3 unincorporated areas:
 Abrolhos Islands, which are officially uninhabited and controlled by the WA Department of Fisheries.

 Kings Park (Botanic Gardens and Parks Authority)

See also

 Government of Australia
 Australian Local Government Association
 List of local government areas by population
 Australian Local Government Fossil Fuel Divestment

References

External links

 July 2008 maps, Australian Standard Geographical Classification (ASGC)
 Australian Bureau of Statistics: Australian Standard Geographical Classification (ASGC) 2005
  – Spreadsheet of population data for local government areas in the 2006 and 2011 Australian census
 Australian Government
 australianpolitics.com
 Local Government Focus (newspaper)
 Local Government and Planning Ministers' Council
 Local Government & Municipal Knowledge Base

 
Politics of Australia
 
Subdivisions of Australia
Local Government Areas
Australia 2